Hiroshi Ishiguro (石黒浩 Ishiguro Hiroshi) is director of the Intelligent Robotics Laboratory, part of the Department of Systems Innovation in the Graduate School of Engineering Science at Osaka University, Japan. A notable development of the laboratory is the Actroid, a humanoid robot with lifelike appearance and visible behaviour such as facial movements.

Work
In robot development, Ishiguro concentrates on the idea of making a robot that is as similar as possible to a live human being. At the unveiling in July 2005 of the gynoid Repliee Q1Expo (in the cybernetic world, the term for female android, gynoid, from ancient Greek "gyne", that is woman) he was quoted as saying, "I have developed many robots before, but I soon realised the importance of its appearance. A human-like appearance gives a robot a strong feeling of presence. ... Repliee Q1Expo can interact with people. It can respond to people touching it. It's very satisfying, although we obviously have a long way to go yet." In his opinion, it may be possible to build an android that is indistinguishable from a human, at least during a brief encounter.

Ishiguro has made an android that resembles him, called the Geminoid. The Geminoid was among the robots featured by James May in his 5 October 2008 BBC2 documentary on robots Man-Machine in May's series Big Ideas. He also introduced a telecommunication robot called the Telenoid R1. Hiroshi also uses the android to teach his classes at Osaka University of Japan and likes to scare his students by making Geminoid do human-like movements like blinking, "breathing" and fidgeting with his hands. Ishiguro has been listed, in 2011, as one of the 15 Asian Scientists to Watch by Asian Scientist Magazine. In 2018, Ishiguro was interviewed interacting with one of his robots for the documentary on artificial intelligence Do You Trust This Computer?.

Career timeline
 1986.3: Graduate of University of Yamanashi 
 1991.3: Graduate of the Graduate School of Engineering Science at Osaka University 
 1994.10: Associate Professor at Kyoto University 
 1998.3: Visiting Fellow of University of California, San Diego 
 2000.4: Associate Professor of Wakayama University 
 2001.4: Professor of Wakayama University 
 2003.4: Professor of Osaka University

Awards
 2011 Osaka Culture Prize
 Prize for Science and Technology by the Minister of Education, Culture, Sports, Science and Technology (MEXT), April 2015
 Best paper award  at the 4th ACM/IEEE International Conference on Human-Robot Interaction (HRI 2009),	March 2009
 Best paper and poster awards at the 2nd ACM/IEEE International Conference on Human-Robot Interaction (HRI 2007), March 2007
 Best Humanoid Award (Kid size) at RoboCup 2006 (Bremen, Germany)

Publications

Publications

Papers

Movie appearances
 Mechanical Love (2007) Ishiguro and his work forms a major component of this documentary on the interrelationship between humans and robots.
 Surrogates (2009) During the opening montage showing the development of the surrogates, there appears footage of Ishiguro and his Geminoid.
 Plug & Pray (2010) Ishiguro is one of the scientists featured in the film
 Samsara (2011 film)
 Robolove (2019) Documentary on the strategies of men and women involved with the creation of humanoid, android robots

References

External links

 
 Geminoid

 

The Gems: https://www.amazon.com/The-Gems-Robert-Black-ebook/dp/B00KGH4ZOE

Living people
Android (robot)
Japanese roboticists
Osaka University alumni
Academic staff of Osaka University
Academic staff of Kyoto University
Year of birth missing (living people)
Academic staff of Wakayama University